Basilica of the Assumption of the Blessed Virgin Mary in Krzeszów ( is a Roman Catholic church and abbey of the Order of Saint Benedict in Krzeszów, Lower Silesian Voivodeship. Built around 1728–1735, it is a notable baroque church in Silesia, with the art of Ferdinand Brokoff (sculptor) and Michael Willmann (painter). It is also one of the shrines to the Virgin Mary, with a 13th old painting. In one of the chapels there is a mausoleum to Silesian Piasts: Bolko I the Strict and Bolko II the Small.

It is a basilica since 1998.

Gallery

External links 
 Basilica of the Assumption of the Blessed Virgin Mary - spherical panorama
FotoKrzeszow

Basilica churches in Poland
Shrines to the Virgin Mary
Kamienna Góra County
Krzeszów
Roman Catholic shrines in Poland
The Most Holy Virgin Mary, Queen of Poland